Raúl Rivero Castañeda (23 November 1945 – 6 November 2021) was a Cuban poet, journalist, and dissident.

Early life and career 
Rivero was born on 23 November 1945 in Morón, Camagüey, in central Cuba.

In his youth, he was an ardent follower of Fidel Castro and the Cuban Revolution. He was among the first generation of journalists to graduate after the triumph of the Revolution. From 1973 to 1976 he was the chief correspondent of the official Cuban press in Moscow. He also served as chairman of the pro-regime National Union of Writers and Artists (UNEAC). He was then known as "the Poet of the Revolution", and associated with the major cultural figures of communist Cuba.

Dissident work
In 1989 Rivero left the National Union of Writers and Artists.  On 2 June 1991, he signed the so-called "letter of the 10 intellectuals", a petition calling for the liberation of political prisoners and the holding of democratic elections. Thereafter Rivero was an outcast within Cuban society. In 1995, he founded Cuba Press, and became active in the Cuban independent journalism movement, publishing his works in newspapers in the United States and other countries.

In 1999 Rivero was awarded Columbia University's Maria Moors Cabot prize for International Journalism. The following year, he was named as one of the International Press Institute's 50 World Press Freedom Heroes of the past 50 years.

During the Cuban government's 2003 "Black Spring" crackdown on dissidents, Rivero was charged with "acting against Cuban independence and attempting to divide Cuban territorial unity", as well as with writing "against the government", organizing "subversive meetings" at his home, and collaborating with U.S. diplomat James Cason. Rivero was convicted and sentenced to twenty years' imprisonment. He spent his first 11 months in a tiny one-man cell with no windows or any contact to the outside world. The arrest and imprisonment of Rivero was later defended by Cuban writer and culture minister Abel Prieto who argued that Rivero "was not arrested for his views, but for receiving US funding for his collaboration with a country that has besieged our island." As Castro fades, a crop of new Cuban leaders Rivero asserted, in prison interrogations as well as in public, that all the funds which he received consisted of fees for his articles, paid by the publishing media, not by governments or political organizations. His account of his life and his treatment by the Cuban government is given in his book "Proof of Contact".

In November 2004 he was released following international pressure on Cuba and subsequently relocated to Spain, and was awarded the UNESCO/Guillermo Cano World Press Freedom Prize.

See also

Human rights in Cuba
Cuban dissident movement
Varela Project

References

External links
Headline articles
Jailed Cuban journalist Raúl Rivero wins UNESCO World Press Freedom Prize
Information on Rivero's release
Biography at Words Without Borders.
Slate article - Article on The Motorcycle Diaries which also pertains to Raúl.

1945 births
2021 deaths
Cuban dissidents
Cuban journalists
Male journalists
Cuban male poets
Maria Moors Cabot Prize winners
Opposition to Fidel Castro
People from Morón, Cuba